Starkowo may refer to the following places:
Starkowo, Greater Poland Voivodeship (west-central Poland)
Starkowo, Bytów County in Pomeranian Voivodeship (north Poland)
Starkowo, Słupsk County in Pomeranian Voivodeship (north Poland)